NGH may refer to:

Northampton General Hospital
Northern General Hospital
Natural gas hydrate
National Guild of Hypnotists